The following is a list of Burundian politicians, both past and present since independence in 1962.



B 
Bagaza, Jean-Baptiste
Bamina, Joseph
Bamvuginyumvira, Frédéric
Barancira, Alphonse
Bararunyeretse, Libère
Bayaganakandi, Epitace
Bigirimana, Balthazar
Biha, Léopold
Buyoya, Pierre
Melchior Bwakira

C 
Cimpaye, Joseph

H 
Hitimana, Mathias

K 
Kabushemeye, Ernest
Kagayo, Jeanne d'Arc
Kamatari, Esther
Kamatari, Godefroid
Kadege, Alphonse-Marie
Kanyenkiko, Anatole
Kinigi, Sylvie

M 
Manwangari, Jean-Baptiste 
Masumbuko, André
Micombero, Michel
Minani, Jean
Muhirwa, André
Mwambutsa IV Bangiricenge
Mworoha, Emile

N 
Nahayo, Immaculée
Ndadaye, Melchior
Ndayikengurukiye, Jean-Bosco
Ndayizeye, Domitien
Ndimira, Pascal-Firmin
Ndizeye, Charles (Ntare V Ndizeye)
Nduwayo, Antoine
Nduwimana, Martin
Ngendandumwe, Pierre
Ngenzebuhoro, Frédéric
Ngeze, François
Nkurunziza, Pierre
Ntahokaja, Nick-Bertrand
Ndayizeye, Domitien
Jean Marie Vianney Kara Ndayambaje
Ntaryamira, Cyprien
Ntibantunganya, Sylvestre
Nyamoya, Albin
Nyangoma, Léonard

Nzambimana, Édouard
Nzeyimana, Joseph
Nzojibwami, Augustin
Nzomukunda, Alice

R 
Rufyikiri, Gervais
Rugambarara, Alphonse
Rwagasore, Louis

S 
Sendegeya, Pierre-Claver
Sibomana, Adrien
Sinamenye, Mathias

 
Politicians